Intelsat 14 is a communications satellite owned by Intelsat located at 45° West longitude, serving the Americas, Europe, and African markets.  Intelsat 14 replaced Intelsat 1R which was at the end of its design life.  It was built by Space Systems Loral, as part of its LS-1300 line.

Communications payload
Intelsat 14 has a C-band and Ku band payload, each of which is further divided to provide service to 2 each coverage areas.

The C-band payload has an Americas beam which covers the southern part of the United States, all of Mexico, Central America, and all of South America. A second C-band beam provides coverage for Western Europe and Africa.

The Ku band payload also has an Americas beam which covers the Alabama, Georgia and Florida, all of the Caribbean, Central America and all of South America except Brazil. The Ku band US/Europe/Africa beam covers the southern eastern United States, Western Europe, and the northern western African countries.

Intelsat 14 also carries an experimental radiation-tolerant IP router payload that can be connected to several of the C and Ku band channels. This experimental payload is known as IRIS (Internet Routing in Space) demonstration.

Launch
Intelsat 14 was launched from Cape Canaveral Air Force Station Space Launch Complex 41 November 23, 2009 on an Atlas V rocket flying in the 431 configuration.  The satellite was released into a geosynchronous transfer orbit 1 hour and 58 minutes after lift-off.

References

Spacecraft launched in 2009
Intelsat satellites
Communications satellites in geostationary orbit
Satellite television